Robert Prunty is an American football coach. He is the head football coach at Hampton University, a position he has held since the 2018 season.

Career
Prunty was the head football coach for Gretna High School in Gretna, Virginia for several years. During his tenure, he led the program from suffering 44 consecutive losses from 1991 to 1995, to an 11–1 season in 2001. After his departure from Gretna, the program went on to win four state championships from 2003 to 2008.

From Gretna, Prunty accepted a position as head football coach of Hargrave Military Academy. He was known for producing players that went on to the National Football League (NFL). Twenty-seven of Prunty's players moved up to the NFL, included two first-round draft picks; Peria Jerry and Branden Albert Branden Albert would go on to credit Hargrave for his success.

Prunty held the position at Hargrave until the end of the 2009 season, accepting the position of defensive ends and outside linebackers coach for Texas Tech under head coach Tommy Tuberville. Hargrave Director of Communications, William Wiebking, expressed surprise at Prunty's departure, stating "We lost a good guy. They just came and plucked him away. We're all stunned.".

In 2011, following the highest ranked recruiting class in Texas Tech history, Prunty earned recognition from Scout.com as the Midlands Recruiter of the Year. Another highly ranked class was produced following the 5–7 2011 Texas Tech Red Raiders football season. Prunty's recruiting again earned him national recognition as the 2012 Scout.com Midlands Recruiter of the Year, as well as the 2011–12 Scout.com/FOXSportsNext Big 12 Recruiter of the Year.

In 2017, Prunty became the defensive line coach for East Carolina, but was promoted to defensive coordinator on September 10, 2017, replacing Kenwick Thompson, who was "reassigned" within the football program in a non-coaching role.

Cincinnati
Following head coach Tommy Tuberville's departure to Cincinnati, Prunty remained a member of the Texas Tech staff through the 2012 Meineke Car Care Bowl of Texas. Following the game, it was announced on January 4, 2013 that Prunty would be following Tuberville to Cincinnati to accept the position of associate head coach and defensive ends coach.

Head coaching record

College

References

External links
 Hampton profile

Year of birth missing (living people)
Living people
Cincinnati Bearcats football coaches
East Carolina Pirates football coaches
Hampton Pirates football coaches
Texas Tech Red Raiders football coaches
Alabama A&M University alumni
High school football coaches in Virginia
People from Chatham, Virginia
African-American coaches of American football
21st-century African-American people